Stanislav Karasi (born 8 November 1946) is a Serbian former football manager and player.

Club career
After coming through the youth system of Red Star Belgrade, Karasi started his senior career with Yugoslav Second League side Borovo. He returned to Red Star Belgrade in spring 1969, spending the next five years with the club. Overall, Karasi totaled 150 appearances and scored 57 goals in the Yugoslav First League, helping the team win the title on three occasions (1969, 1970, and 1973).

In 1974, after meeting the Yugoslav FA transfer eligibility requirements, Karasi decided to go abroad to France and signed with Lille. He spent three seasons with the club, making 109 league appearances and scoring 35 goals. In 1977, Karasi moved to Belgium and played for Royal Antwerp until 1979. He subsequently went to the United States to play indoor soccer with the Buffalo Stallions. In 1981, Karasi returned to Yugoslavia and joined OFK Beograd, but moved back to the Major Indoor Soccer League by signing with the New York Arrows in March 1982. He would finish his career with time at two Belgrade clubs, Hajduk and Sinđelić.

International career
At international level, Karasi represented Yugoslavia between 1973 and 1974, collecting 10 caps and scoring four goals. He appeared at the 1974 FIFA World Cup, netting twice in the process.

Managerial career
After hanging up his boots, Karasi served as manager of numerous clubs, including Obilić, Erzurumspor (Turkey), Mladost Lučani, Zvezdara, Bežanija, BASK, and Borac Banja Luka (Bosnia and Herzegovina).

Personal life
Karasi is the son-in-law of Yugoslav People's Army general Veljko Kadijević.

Career statistics

Honours
Red Star Belgrade
 Yugoslav First League: 1968–69, 1969–70, 1972–73
 Yugoslav Cup: 1969–70, 1970–71

References

External links
 
 
 

1946 births
Living people
Footballers from Belgrade
Yugoslav people of Hungarian descent
Serbian people of Hungarian descent
Yugoslav footballers
Serbian footballers
Association football forwards
Yugoslavia international footballers
1974 FIFA World Cup players
HNK Borovo players
Red Star Belgrade footballers
Lille OSC players
Royal Antwerp F.C. players
Buffalo Stallions players
OFK Beograd players
New York Arrows players
FK Hajduk Beograd players
FK Sinđelić Beograd players
Yugoslav Second League players
Yugoslav First League players
Ligue 1 players
Belgian Pro League players
Major Indoor Soccer League (1978–1992) players
Yugoslav expatriate footballers
Expatriate footballers in France
Expatriate footballers in Belgium
Expatriate soccer players in the United States
Yugoslav expatriate sportspeople in France
Yugoslav expatriate sportspeople in Belgium
Yugoslav expatriate sportspeople in the United States
Yugoslav football managers
Serbia and Montenegro football managers
Serbian football managers
FK Spartak Subotica managers
FK Sutjeska Nikšić managers
FK Obilić managers
Erzurumspor managers
FK Mladost Lučani managers
FK Bežanija managers
FK Borac Banja Luka managers
Süper Lig managers
Premier League of Bosnia and Herzegovina managers
Serbia and Montenegro expatriate football managers
Serbian expatriate football managers
Expatriate football managers in Turkey
Expatriate football managers in Bosnia and Herzegovina
Serbia and Montenegro expatriate sportspeople in Turkey
Serbian expatriate sportspeople in Bosnia and Herzegovina